Paul Robert Wilson (born 3 July 1941 in Hamilton, Ontario) is a Canadian translator and writer. In 1967 he moved to Czechoslovakia where he performed as a singer with The Plastic People of the Universe. Because he was a member of this group, he was expelled from Czechoslovakia in 1977. This band was banned in Czechoslovakia and their recordings could not be officially released. Wilson later founded a record label Boží Mlýn and released some of their recordings in Canada. 

Paul Wilson later went on to become one of the major translators into English of Václav Havel's work. In 2006 he was working on a new translation of The Memorandum for the Havel Festival, which also features two of his other translations.
He also translated many books, such as I Served the King of England by Bohumil Hrabal, from Czech to English, and more recently Mr. Kafka and Other Tales from the Time of the Cult (2015).

References

External links
Official website

1941 births
Living people
Canadian male singers
Canadian translators
Musicians from Hamilton, Ontario
Czech–English translators
Writers from Hamilton, Ontario